Joseph Simons is an American attorney who formerly served as chairman of the Federal Trade Commission.

Education
Simons received a Bachelor of Arts in economics and history from Cornell University in 1980 and his Juris Doctor cum laude from Georgetown University Law Center in 1983.

FTC career
Simons was chief of the Federal Trade Commission's competition bureau from 2001 to 2003. He was a partner at Paul, Weiss, Rifkind, Wharton & Garrison LLP. Simons is also a co-developer of “Critical Loss Analysis,” a technique for market definition that has been incorporated into the Department of Justice and FTC Merger Guidelines, as well as applied in numerous court decisions.

On October 19, 2017, the White House announced that President Donald Trump would nominate Simons to be chairman of the Federal Trade Commission. He took office on May 1, 2018, and was scheduled to depart on January 29, 2021; he was replaced as chair on January 21.

Notably, the FTC under Simons filed an antitrust lawsuit against Facebook in December 2020.

References

Living people
American lawyers
Cornell University alumni
Georgetown University Law Center alumni
Federal Trade Commission personnel
Year of birth missing (living people)
Trump administration personnel